Dean Ross (born 19 January 1955) is a former Australian rules footballer who played with St Kilda in the Victorian Football League (VFL).

Notes

External links 

Living people
1955 births
Australian rules footballers from Victoria (Australia)
St Kilda Football Club players
Dandenong Football Club players